Judge Ford may refer to:

Francis Ford (judge) (1882–1975), judge of the United States District Court for the District of Massachusetts
Hiram Church Ford (1884–1969), judge of the United States District Court for the Eastern District of Kentucky
Morgan Ford (1911–1992), judge of the United States Court of International Trade
J.J. (Josie-Jo) Ford, fictional judge in the novel, The Westing Game